St. Dominic Savio College is a co-educational intermediate level college in Lucknow, Uttar Pradesh, India. It imparts education from  nursery to intermediate level. It was established in 1977.

St. Dominic Savio College
St. Dominic Savio College  is an unaided Minority Educational Institution (F. No. 1480 of 2006/14307)  It was stablished and administered by the Catholic Diocese of Lucknow, a Society Registered under the Societies Registration Act XXI of 1860.  Founded in 1977 with the object of imparting modern education to Catholic Students in a manner that will conserve their "religion, language and culture" but admission is not denied to students professing other faiths. The college is named after St. Dominic Savio, a model and example for young boys and girls.

About St.Dominic Savio 

The Patron, Saint Dominic was born in Riva, Italy, on 2 April 1842. While he was very young, he cherished the ideals of cheerfulness, truthfulness and honesty. In the school he was a lovable friend To all and was ready to help his companions. He could not continue serving his fellowmen very long as he was called to his eternal reward at the young age of 15 on 9 March 1857.

Aim of the College 
The aim of the College is the integral formation of students through moral, spiritual, intellectual, physical and social development, so that they find a meaning in their life for the future.

(i)	Admission:- Admission are open to Nursery class falling within the age group between 3 years 6 months and 4 years 6 months on 1 April of the academic year and a corresponding scale of age for the higher classes.

(ii)	Nursery:- Registration forms will normally be made available at the college office for a period which will be notified on the college notice board. The Registration forms should be returned to the office duly filled by the specified date as notified on the Notice Board.

 (iii) The Registration Forms should be filled and submitted along with:
 (a)	Date Of Birth Certificate from:
 (i)	Nagar Maha Palika
 (ii)	The Maternity Hospital
 (iii)	Baptism Certificate
 (iv)	An affidavit based on the original birth certificate
 (b)	Two latest passport-size photographs.

(iv) On the date and time specified, on the slip provided on submission of Application Form, the parents along with the child will meet the Principal.

(vi)	Other Classes: Generally, there are no admissions to other classes as children from lower classes are promoted and go to the higher classes. However, if some vacancies arise because of withdrawals, opportunity is provided to all those who would like to seek admission to other classes.

Location 
It is located in front of Bhootnath Market Road and is standing next to St.John's School.For further details about its location please refer to-

Principal's List
Rev. Father A.Lobo
Rev. Father Paul Rodriguez
Rev. Father Oswald Lewis
Rev. Father Peter D'Souza
Rev. Father Vincent Nazereth
Rev. Father Victor Lobo
Rev. Father Simon Fernandes
Rev. Father Robert Quadrus
Rev. Father Felix Menezes
Rev. Father Claudius D Almeida
Present Rev. Father Robert D Douza

References 

 

Intermediate colleges in Uttar Pradesh
Schools in Lucknow
1977 establishments in Uttar Pradesh
Educational institutions established in 1977